Parliamentary elections were held in the Federated States of Micronesia on 7 March 2017, alongside a referendum on allowing dual citizenship. Although the proposed constitutional amendment to allow dual citizenship was approved by a majority of voters, it did not pass the threshold of 75% voting in favour in at least three of the four states.

Electoral system
The 14 members of Congress are elected by two methods; ten are elected in single-member constituencies by first-past-the-post voting for two year terms. The four at-large Senators are elected on the basis of one from each state, for four year terms

Following the elections, the President and Vice-President are elected by the Congress, with only the four at-large Senators allowed to be candidates.

Results

Congress

Referendum
The constitutional amendment to allow dual citizenship was passed in all four states, but only by more than 75% of voters in Kosrae.

References

Elections in the Federated States of Micronesia
2017 in the Federated States of Micronesia
Micronesia
Election and referendum articles with incomplete results
Referendums in the Federated States of Micronesia
Micronesia
March 2017 events in Oceania